Ted Judge is a paralympic athlete from the United States competing mainly in category C1 events. Ted competed in two events in the 1984 Summer Paralympics in athletics. He won medals in both, with a respective silver and bronze.

References

Paralympic track and field athletes of the United States
Athletes (track and field) at the 1984 Summer Paralympics
Paralympic silver medalists for the United States
Paralympic bronze medalists for the United States
Living people
Year of birth missing (living people)
Medalists at the 1984 Summer Paralympics
Paralympic medalists in athletics (track and field)